The Tunisian national handball team , nicknamed Les Aigles de Carthage (The Eagles of Carthage or The Carthage Eagles), is the national handball team of Tunisia. It is governed by the Tunisian Handball Federation and takes part in international handball competitions.

The Tunisian Handball League was established in 1953. In 1957, the Tunisian Handball Federation was founded, and was later admitted into the International Handball Federation in 1962.

The Tunisian national handball team has participated in several handball world championships. In 2005 Tunisia finished in 4th place; becoming the second non-European team to reach the World Championship semi-finals after Egypt who was able to reach the semi-final match in 2001. The Tunisian national handball team won the African Nations Championship for a record 10 times (1974, 1976, 1979, 1994, 1998, 2002, 2006, 2010, 2012, 2018). The Tunisians won the 2018 African Championship in Gabon by defeating Egypt in the final match. Egypt and Algeria are Tunisia's main rivals in the African continent.

The national squad is primarily and usually composed of players from Espérance Tunis, Club Africain and Étoile du Sahel; these teams being the traditional powerhouses of the Tunisian handball scene, as well players competing in Europe mainly in France.

History 
Tunisia is the team on the African continent with the best track record: it is the most successful team in the African Nations Championship with ten titles won in 1974, 1976, 1979, 1994, 1998, 2002, 2006, 2010, 2012 and 2018, and played in the final eight times in 1985, 1992, 1996, 2004, 2008, 2014, 2016 and 2020. They also won a bronze medal six times in 1981, 1983, 1987, 1989, 1991 and 2000.

At the World Championships, in 2005 it obtained the best performance obtained by an African country, a fourth place, thus equaling Egypt (place obtained in 2001). They also played in the final of the Statoil World Cup, an unofficial international competition, in 2006.

During the 2005–06 season, Heykel Megannem was voted the best player in the French championship, with Wissem Hmam and Issam Tej also being in the standard team, respectively as left-back and pivot. Following the 2009 world championship, the federation sidelined Issam Tej for "indiscipline, insolence and recidivism" and Makram Missaoui for "having refused to resume play against Poland", while Maher Kraiem was suspended for three months for “misconduct”.

The team is coached by the Croatian Sead Hasanefendić until June 2008, before being replaced by the Serb Zoran Živković from 24 October 2008. However, the federation dismisses him following the poor performance of the team during the 2009 world championship. He was replaced by the Tunisian Sayed Ayari then, in June 2009, by the Frenchman Alain Portes, who signed a three-year contract.

In 2013, Alain Portes' contract not being renewed, he took over from Olivier Krumbholz at the head of the French women's team and was replaced by Sead Hasanefendić, back at the head of the national team for the following three seasons. In 2020, coach Toni Gerona is dismissed. His replacement would be a Spaniard according to the Tunisian Handball Federation.

Infrastructure 
The El Menzah Sports Palace, built in 1967, is the historic hall of the national team. Built for the 2005 World Men's Handball Championship, of which it hosted the final and all of Tunisia's matches, the Salle Omnisport de Radès now hosted most of the national team's matches.

Other infrastructures, such as the Taoufik-Bouhima hall in Radès, the Hammamet hall and the Bir Challouf hall in Nabeul also have the opportunity to see the national team evolve.

Honours

Official competitions 
World Championships

 Fourth place (1): 2005

African Nations Championship

  Champions (10) : 1974, 1976, 1979, 1994, 1998, 2002, 2006, 2010, 2012, 2018
  Runners-up (8): 1985, 1992, 1996, 2004, 2008, 2014, 2016, 2020
  Third Place (6): 1981, 1983, 1987, 1989, 1991, 2000
 Fourth place (1): 2022

African Games

  Runners-up (1): 1978
  Third Place (2): 1965, 2007

Mediterranean Games

  Runners-up (2): 2001, 2018
  Third Place (4): 1967, 1979, 2005, 2009
 Fourth place (2): 1975, 1983

Pan Arab Games

  Champions (1): 1985
  Third Place (2): 1992, 2011

Minor tournaments 
World cup

  Runners-up (1):  2006

Yellow Cup

  Champions (4):  2007, 2015, 2016, 2019
  Runners-up (4):  2002, 2003, 2004, 2020
  Third Place (2):  2008, 2010

Paris Ile-de-France tournament

  Champions (1):  2005
  Third Place (4):  1998, 2002, 2007, 2013
Championnat maghrébin des nations
  Champions (3):  1969, 1971, 1973

Tunisia international tournament

  Champions (3):  2015, 2017, 2021

Four Nations Cup Poland

  Champions (2):  2021, 2022
Challenge Marrane
  Champions (1):  2008
Four Nations Tournament
  Runners-up (1):  2015

Air Caraïbes Cup

  Runners-up (1):  2019
Spain international tournament
  Third Place (3):  1999, 2002, 2012

Competitive record
 Champions   Runners-up   Third place   Fourth place  

Red border color indicates tournament was held on home soil.

Olympic Games

World Championship

Tunisia did not compete From 1938 to 1964 and 1970 to 1993.
Red border color indicates tournament was held on home :soil.

African Championship

African Games

Mediterranean Games

Pan Arab Games

Other records

Team

Current squad
Squad for the 2023 World Men's Handball Championship.

Head coach: Patrick Cazal

Head coaches

Notable players

See also
Tunisian Handball Federation
Tunisia women's national handball team
Tunisia men's national junior handball team
Tunisia men's national youth handball team
Tunisia women's national junior handball team
Tunisia women's national youth handball team

Other handball codes
Tunisia national beach handball team
Tunisia women's national beach handball team

References

External links

IHF profile

Men's national handball teams
Handball in Tunisia